The Royal Hashemite Court (RHC) (Al-Diwan Al-Malaki Al-Hāshimy), which is historically known as Al-Maqar, is the administrative and political link between the King of Jordan and the Jordanian regime which includes constitutional authorities (governmental, legislative and judicial), the Armed Forces and the Security Services. It also acts as the primary body responsible for supervising the relationship between the King and the Jordanian people.

Established in 1946, at the time of the independence of the Hashemite Kingdom of Jordan, the RHC is the official institution that oversees the preparation and implementation of the King's local and international activities, while providing the necessary political, administrative and diplomatic support to the state in order to enable them to fulfil the tasks entrusted to them by the constitution.

Senior officers
 Yousef Aleisawi
 Bisher Al-Khasawneh

References

External links